Michael Kessel (born 28 August 1984) is a German footballer who plays as a midfielder for SpVg Porz.

References

External links
 
 Michael Kessel at FuPa

German footballers
Association football midfielders
Borussia Mönchengladbach II players
SC Fortuna Köln players
3. Liga players
1984 births
Living people